Jimmy Connors was the defending champion, but he withdrew from his semifinals match this year.

Ivan Lendl won the tournament, beating Mats Wilander in the final, 6–0, 6–4.

Seeds

Draw

Finals

Top half

Bottom half

External links
 Main draw

1985 Grand Prix (tennis)
Tokyo Indoor